Nyaribari Masaba is an electoral constituency in Kenya. It is one of nine constituencies in Kisii County. The constituency was established for the 1988 elections.

Members of Parliament

Wards

Masaba South Sub-county
Masaba South Sub-county shares common boundaries with Nyaribari Masaba Sub-county. It's in the sub-county that the Kisii County part of Keroka is located. The Sub-county is headed by the sub-county administrator, appointed by a County Public Service Board.

References 

Constituencies in Kisii County
Constituencies in Nyanza Province
1988 establishments in Kenya
Constituencies established in 1988